A by-election was held for the Australian House of Representatives seat of Wilmot on 27 May 1939. This was triggered by the death of Prime Minister Joseph Lyons, a member of the United Australia Party.

The by-election was won by Labor candidate Lancelot Spurr.

Results

Prime Minister Joseph Lyons died.

References

1939 elections in Australia
Tasmanian federal by-elections
1930s in Tasmania